Pterostichus empetricola is a species of woodland ground beetle in the family Carabidae. It is found in Europe and Northern Asia (excluding China) and North America.

References

Further reading

 

Pterostichus
Articles created by Qbugbot
Beetles described in 1828